The Omaha Black Music Hall of Fame, or the OBMHoF, is a nonprofit organization founded in 2005 to celebrate, document and honour the legacy of the many top vocalists and musicians whose musical careers began in the metropolitan area of Omaha, Nebraska. It has a particular focus on African American music from North Omaha, and is committed to honoring Omaha's blues tradition from the 1920s to the present day. The OBMHoF holds induction ceremonies every two years that highlight, but are not limited to, classical, rhythm & blues, big band, jazz and gospel music.

About
Vaughn Chatman, a former Omaha rhythm-and-blues player and attorney in Sacramento, California, formed the Omaha Black Music Hall of Fame in 2005. According to one local newspaper, the Hall of Fame was formed to acknowledge Omaha's own musicians.  "Enough Omaha artists have impacted the industry to rival the legacy from historical music hotbeds like Kansas City, Mo. The contributions of these Omaha-bred-and-born may add up to one of black music’s largest untold stories."  Omaha's significance has been better known as a venue for nationally popular African American jazz, blues and rock greats, many of whom performed at the Dreamland Ballroom.

Ceremonies 

The Omaha Black Music Hall of Fame hold ceremonies every two years to coincide with the bi-annual Native Omaha Days event, which draws thousands to the Near North Omaha neighborhood to celebrate the history of the African American community in Omaha. It's ceremonies have different locations, and there are varying numbers of inductees every biennium.

2005 
The first inductions to the Omaha Black Music Hall of Fame were in 2005. The induction ceremony was held on 4 August 2005 at Harrah's Casino in neighboring Council Bluffs, Iowa. There were 40 inductees:

2007 

The 2007 Omaha Black Music Hall Of Fame inductions ceremony was held at Qwest Center, Omaha.  Other musical awards were made in the Gospel/Civic/Sports Awards Ceremony, and the Blues/Classical/Jazz/R&B Awards Ceremony.

"The Omaha Black Music Hall of Fame inductees are inspirational community leaders, exceptional musicians and vocalists, including gospel pioneers who left their mark on the civic and music scene. This includes top civic leaders, musicians and vocalists who started in Omaha and moved on to other cities to pursue professional and music careers."

In 2007 there were 67 total inductees into the Hall, including 23 who were deceased and 54 living. They represented a variety of music genres and connections to Omaha's Black music community. The categories included gospel, R&B, Jazz, Rock & Roll and Classical music.

2011 

The 2011 inductions to the Omaha's Black Music Hall of Fame were held on July 29, 2011 at the Slowdown in Omaha, Nebraska. MAN vs MAN Band's historic performance at the awards ceremony celebrated a 40-year concert reunion.  Other artist performing at the event included: Maxayn, Ahnjel, Sam Singleton, and Hank Redd Jr.   The 2011 inductees to the Omaha Black Music Hall of Fame were: Hank Redd Jr., Jeanne Rogers, Charles "Chuck" Miller, Red Higgins, Bertha Myers, Adrienne Higgins Brown-Norman, Preston Love,  Sam Singleton, Maxayn Lewis, MAN vs MAN Band: Walter McKinney,  Len Harris M.D., Donald Harris, Kevin Harris, Glenn Franklin, Lonzo Franklin, Melvin Hall, Leroi Brashears, & Nils Anders Erickson;  The New Breed of Soul Band and Andre Davis. web page.

Recipients 

During the ceremony the Steppen Stonz were also awarded a "Showcase Legend Award".

See also
Culture of North Omaha, Nebraska
Music of Omaha
 List of music museums

Notes

References

External links
Omaha Black Music Hall of Fame website

Halls of fame in Nebraska
Music of Omaha, Nebraska
Music museums in the United States
Museums in Omaha, Nebraska
Organizations based in Omaha, Nebraska
African-American history in Omaha, Nebraska
North Omaha, Nebraska
Awards established in 2005
2005 establishments in Nebraska
African-American history of Nebraska